György Fetter (born 2 October 1963) is a Hungarian sprinter. He competed in the men's 100 metres at the 1988 Summer Olympics.

References

1963 births
Living people
Athletes (track and field) at the 1988 Summer Olympics
Hungarian male sprinters
Olympic athletes of Hungary
Athletes from Budapest